Pathmark is a supermarket brand owned by Allegiance Retail Services, a retailers’ cooperative based in Iselin, New Jersey, USA. Pathmark currently has one location in East Flatbush, Brooklyn, New York, which it has operated since 2019.

From 1968 until 2015, Pathmark operated a chain of supermarkets throughout the northeastern United States. The chain was founded by Supermarkets General, which previously operated ShopRite stores as a member of the Wakefern cooperative and chose to go into business for itself as a direct competitor. The company would eventually take the Pathmark name and would later be purchased by competing supermarket chain A&P in 2007.

Before its initial closure, Pathmark previously operated stores in New York, New Jersey, Connecticut, Pennsylvania, Delaware, and Maryland.  In 2007, Supermarket News ranked Pathmark No. 31 in its annual "Top 75 North American Food Retailers" based on Pathmark's 2006 estimated sales of $4.1 billion. Based on 2005 revenue, Pathmark was the 67th largest retailer in the United States.

Pathmark is well known by baby-boomers for its radio and television commercials starring character actor James Karen, who was the chain's spokesperson for more than 20 years. Pathmark's original spokesperson was Arlene Francis, who appeared in its commercials beginning almost immediately after Pathmark left the ShopRite cooperative. Peter "Produce Pete" Napolitano had starred in many of the company's commercials from 2001 until 2009.

After A&P filed for Chapter 11 bankruptcy in 2015, Pathmark’s remaining stores were liquidated and closed. 

In 2016, Allegiance Retail Services purchased the Pathmark name and all intellectual property with the intention of reviving the well-known brand. The brand’s first new location under Allegiance ownership opened April 12, 2019, in Brooklyn, NY.  The company has stated that they will see how this first location performs before opening additional locations.

History
Pathmark began when some of the supermarkets of the Wakefern Food Corporation, parent company of ShopRite, broke away in 1968, as some independent New Jersey grocers felt they needed to compete better with large supermarket chains. Some members of the cooperative agreed to operate their stores under the ShopRite name. Wakefern was both a wholesale operation and a retail operation; among its members was a subgroup, Supermarkets Operating Co., in Union, New Jersey, formed in 1956 by Alex Aidekman, Herb Brody, and Milt Perlmutter. This company opened ShopRite stores; in 1963 it branched into nonfood retail by acquiring Crown Drugs.

Supermarkets Operating Co. and General Super Markets (another subgroup within Wakefern) merged in 1966 to become Supermarkets General Corporation, with Perlmutter as president. Supermarkets General operated 75 ShopRite stores across Connecticut, Delaware, Maryland, New Jersey, New York, and Pennsylvania by 1966, with annual sales of about $420 million. Supermarkets General achieved high volume by opening large stores in densely populated areas and keeping prices low on both nationally branded-goods and private-label items.

1960s
In 1968, Supermarkets General left the Wakefern cooperative, renaming its ShopRite stores Pathmark. Although Supermarkets General had other holdings, including the recently acquired Genung's, Howland's, Goerke's and Steinbach department store chains (the first three eventually were merged into Steinbach in the 1970s) and Rickel home centers, Pathmark was its major operation. Pathmark's stores included not only supermarkets (33 of which had a drug department with a pharmacy) but 11 freestanding drugstores and 11 gasoline stations.

Pathmark's 81 supermarkets were accounting for about 85 percent of Supermarkets General's sales and 80 percent of its earnings in 1969.

1970s
The number of Pathmark supermarkets had reached 91 in October 1971, with 38 others either a gas station or a drugstore. In May 1972, all but 2 of the 96 supermarkets began operating seven days a week, and around the clock during the work week ("TWEN-ty four hours a day," in the words of television spokesman/actor James Karen, from the 1970s to the early 1990s.) It was the first New York-area supermarket chain to have stores with overnight hours.

In 1974, Pathmark pioneered the use of computer scanners at checkout counters.

In 1975, Pathmark, as part of a negotiated deal with the United Farm Workers, agreed to lead a delegation of East Coast-based supermarket chains to lobby the California Legislature on the passage of the first legislation in the nation that provided a mechanism for farmworkers to choose union representation by secret ballot.  The legislation ended the conflict between the Teamsters and UFW.

In 1977, after relative stagnation, Pathmark opened its first Super Center, a larger, discount grocery store which also offered health and beauty aids, small appliances, and videotape rentals. These  units generally were expanding and renovating existing stores. By December Pathmark had pharmacies in 81 of its 103 supermarkets, horticulture departments in 64, bakery departments in 60, and "mini-bank branches" in 13. In its 1977 annual report, Supermarkets General claimed its sales per store were the highest in the industry. "Pathmark does more than three times the business in a store only 33% larger than the industry average," the report said.

In its 1978 annual report, Supermarkets General claimed Pathmark had become the top supermarket chain in the New York area, with a 15-percent sales share. Twelve of its 109 stores now were Super Centers. That year, Pathmark sales volume was $1.8 billion; the chain contributed 82 percent to corporate profits. About 60 percent of the volume was generated in stores opened, enlarged, or substantially remodeled in the mid-1970s. Perlmutter died in 1978 and was succeeded by Louis Lowenstein as chief executive officer of Supermarkets General.

After about a year Lowenstein was removed and replaced by vice chairman Herb Brody, who shortly before his death in 1985 was succeeded by president Leonard Lieberman, who remained CEO until the company went private, co-founder Alex Aidekman remained on board as one of the CEOs until his retirement in 1987, but passed away in 1990.

1980s
Pathmark sales reached $2.8 billion in 1982, when it was the nation's 10th-largest supermarket chain. Of the 121 units, 62 were Super Centers, 27 included a Barnes & Noble mini-bookstore, 19 had a cheese shop, and 13 were freestanding drug stores. Pathmark continued to dominate Supermarkets General's sales and operating profits, with 87 and 83 percent of the corporate total respectively. Pathmark opened its first Manhattan superstore, a  unit, in Pike Slip, near Chinatown, in 1983. The chain was still No. 1 in the New York metropolitan area in 1985, with a 12.5 percent sales share.

To foil a takeover bid by Dart Group Corp., management took Supermarkets General private in a $2.1 billion leveraged buyout in 1987, in which Merrill Lynch Capital Markets Inc. received 55 percent of the shares, Equitable Life Assurance Society of the U.S., 35 percent, with management retaining 10 percent. Servicing the debt ($1.6 billion in early 1990, half of it in junk bonds) soon proved a problem. The company sold 25 of its free-standing drug stores in New Hampshire and Massachusetts to the Mellville Corp., which at the time operated CVS Stores.

Although corporate sales reached $6 billion in fiscal 1989 (which ended January 28, 1989), the 51-unit Rickel subsidiary was performing poorly, while Pathmark, now with 142 stores, had slipped to third place in the New York area. Many Pathmark units had become, according to a Forbes article, "unkempt, dirty, and outmoded." The article goes on with "continues to stock scores of the dreary no-frills offerings customers have shunned for years." Merrill Lynch fired Chief Executive Kenneth Peskin, replacing him with Jack Futterman. The only bright spot for the parent company was its 66-unit Purity Supreme division, consisting of Massachusetts grocery and convenience store chains acquired in 1984. This division was sold in 1991 for about $265 million. (Supermarkets General's department stores had been sold in 1986.)

Supermarkets General lost money in each fiscal year from 1988 to 1993, and sales volume annually during FY 1989 to 1993. In fiscal 1993 it lost a record $617 million on sales of $4.34 billion, mainly reflecting a $600 million writedown of goodwill (the premium paid in excess of assets) in the 1987 buyout. The company's interest payments, averaging between $160 million and $180 million yearly on its debt, were hampering its efforts to modernize its stores and keep pace with competitors. Pathmark now had 146 supermarkets, 33 freestanding drug stores, and 7 distribution-processing facilities.

1990s
In March 1993, Supermarkets General wanted to take Pathmark public, but backed off due to insufficient investor interest. That October, in a corporate reorganization, Supermarkets General Corp., a subsidiary of Supermarkets General Holdings Corp., changed its name to Pathmark Stores, Inc.; in essence, it recapitalized $1.3 billion in outstanding debt. Pathmark lowered its interest costs, from 13 percent to 9 percent of revenue, increasing cash flow, which allowed Pathmark to increase capital investment. Rickel was spun off; it was sold in 1994.

Pathmark now was betting on stores larger in size than its Super Centers. In 1995 there were 27 such stores, including some remodeled Pathmarks. The stores emphasized perishables, including produce, seafood, baked goods, flowers, plus health and beauty aids, in hoping to compete with drug store and discount competitors. These goods had higher profit margins than packaged groceries. Pathmark 2000 stores also featured a customer service desk for product returns, video rentals, film processing, and UPS delivery; and restrooms with tables for changing diapers. There were 44 such stores in May 1996, with 53 in February 1997.

In 1994, Pathmark added to its private-label products, introducing an upscale line, Pathmark Preferred, to its generic and mid-tier brands. Pathmark's over 3,300 private-label items were accounting for about 24 percent of its sales. In late 1995, Pathmark launched Chef's Creations, which offered a menu of entrees, side dishes, and salads, made daily by a team of chefs. In late 1996, Pathmark introduced Chef's Creations To Go, fresh, prepackaged meals for takeout, offering choice entrees and side dishes in microwavable containers. An outside manufacturer was preparing these meals to Pathmark's specifications.

By summer 1994, Pathmark regained popularity among New Yorkers, according to one survey that found it to be the city's most popular supermarket chain. About one-sixth of city residents were regular Pathmark shoppers; most of those cited its low prices. The top-ranking chain in Brooklyn, the Bronx, and Staten Island, Pathmark now was operating 17 superstores in the city. Meanwhile, Pathmark's eight Connecticut units had declining sales each quarter. In 1992, two Connecticut supermarkets were converted to a new deep-discount drug store format, Pathmark Super-Drug, which reduced the perishable selection but greatly increased the store's general-merchandise offerings, as well as added a warehouse-sized package section. By 1994, another four Connecticut Pathmark supermarkets were converted. Pathmark Super-Drug stores were modeled after similar chains, such as Phar-Mor and RX Place (operated by Woolworth).

Pathmark was named 1995 "Pharmacy Chain of the Year" by the magazine Drug Topics, the first time a supermarket had won the award. Of Pathmark's 142 supermarkets, all had pharmacies except 6 found in shopping centers where there were lease restrictions. According to Pathmark, it was the leader in filling prescriptions in the New York area, and was participating in over 200 major insurance plans. Prescriptions accounted for nearly 7 percent of Pathmark's sales volume in 1994. Futterman, Pathmark's chief executive officer, is, in fact, a registered pharmacist.

In June 1995, Pathmark reduced its pharmacy operations, selling 30 of its 36 freestanding drugstores to Rite Aid Corp. for $60 million. These pharmacies had accounted for sales of $145 million in FY 1995, about 3.5 percent of Pathmark's total. A company executive said that although the 30 stores were profitable, Pathmark had decided to concentrate on supermarket pharmacies, which were more efficient and attractive to customers. Pathmark's remaining 6 drugstores, operating under the "Super Drug" banner in Connecticut, were closed in 1995 and 1996. In September 1998, Pathmark's two remaining Connecticut supermarkets, in Bridgeport and Norwalk, were closed, signaling Pathmark's exit from New England.

Construction began in August 1997 on Pathmark's controversial $14.5 million supermarket on 125th Street in Manhattan's East Harlem. This  unit was the largest supermarket in Harlem, and had been bitterly opposed by owners of neighborhood convenience stores. This Pathmark was expected to generate hundreds of construction jobs, and within the store, which would include a pharmacy and a Chase bank branch.

Supermarkets General cut its losses in fiscal year 1994 (ending January 29, 1994, which the company defined as 1993) to $17 million (excluding extraordinary items and accounting changes) on net sales of $4.21 billion. It had its first profitable year in fiscal year 1995 (ended January 28, 1995) since fiscal year 1987, earning $10 million (not counting a $13 million credit for prior losses) on $4.21 billion in net sales. Pathmark sales were $3.84 billion and $3.79 in fiscal 1994 and 1995 respectively.

In fiscal year 1996 (ending February 3, 1996), Supermarkets General had net income of $77 million on sales of $3.97 billion. Pathmark's sales were $3.85 billion. In fiscal year 1997 (ending February 1, 1997), the parent company had a net loss of $20 million on sales of $3.71 billion. This included a charge the company took for the upcoming sale of 12 unprofitable Pathmark stores, mostly in southern New Jersey. Pathmark's supermarket sales came to all but $9 million of the corporate total. Same-store sales decreased 2.8 percent from the previous fiscal year, primarily due to heavy competition. James Donald, Futterman's successor as chief executive officer, laid off over 200 employees at Pathmark's Woodbridge, New Jersey headquarters in March 1997.

Woodbridge was home to Pathmark's corporate headquarters, and distribution facilities for dry groceries, meat, dairy, and delicatessen products, plus a distribution facility for frozen food in Dayton, New Jersey, a complex for dry groceries in New Brunswick, New Jersey; and one for general merchandise (health care, beauty products, pharmaceuticals, and tobacco) in Edison, New Jersey. It had processing facilities for delicatessen products in Somerset, New Jersey and for banana ripening in Avenel, New Jersey. All but five were either Pathmark 2000 or Super Center stores, and all but seven included a pharmacy.

In October 1997 Pathmark announced that C&S Wholesale Grocers of Brattleboro, Vermont would take over its distribution facilities and become the chain's supplier for almost all groceries and perishables. Pathmark received $50 million from the deal, which was used towards its $1.47 billion debt.

In 1999, Pathmark proposed the sale of itself to Royal Ahold, a Dutch supermarket company which operated Edwards stores in the New York area. Under the terms of the deal, Edwards Super Food Stores would become Pathmarks. The sale was abandoned after the FTC rejected Ahold's offer to divest overlapping stores, saying the offer would "not preserve competition" in the New York area. Ahold decided to cancel the acquisition; in 2000 it announced that it would rebrand Edwards stores as Stop & Shop.

2000s
Because the FTC did not allow Pathmark's acquisition plans, it filed for bankruptcy in July 2000, recovering early the next year. Pathmark, in 2001, bought six Grand Union supermarkets that Ahold was unable to buy. In 2005, the Yucaipa Companies bought a 40 percent stake in Pathmark.

In February 2007, Pathmark partnered with Wild Oats Markets by adding Wild Oats-brand private label goods to the 141 Pathmarks. Approximately 150 organic and natural products were included in the partnership, among them: Italian sodas, balsamic vinegar, organic fruit spreads, and flatbread crackers.

The A&P Takeover
Later in 2007, Pathmark's competitor A&P bought it for $665 million; pending  shareholder approval, along with complying with anti-trust laws. Conditions for the acquisition included the sale of six Pathmarks to competitors. Pathmark and A&P remained separate banners. Store level staff were not affected, while buying and back-office functions were consolidated. The merger was approved on December 3, with the sale completed that month.

Pathmark Sav-A-Center
In spring 2008, Pathmark introduced a "price impact" store concept, under the Pathmark Sav-A-Center brand. This format was introduced to remodeled stores in Irvington and South Edison, New Jersey. The Sav-A-Center name had been used for A&P stores in the 1980s, and for an A&P-owned chain of stores in the New Orleans area which were sold in 2007.

After the concept was tested in the two Northern New Jersey stores, A&P announced the conversion of 16 Pathmark Super Centers, plus 8 of the 13 Philadelphia-area A&P Super Fresh stores to the Pathmark Sav-A-Center banner. A&P eventually rolled out the Sav-A-Center branding to Pathmark's website and circulars.

In 2009, several changes were made to Pathmark. Among them, the North Edison, New Jersey store was closed, and a former A&P in nearby South Plainfield opened as a Pathmark Sav-A-Center.  The North Plainfield Pathmark also closed as part of this store consolidation. Meanwhile, A&P was updating its former Super Center branding by retrofitting older stores with new interior decor to comply with its Sav-A-Center branding.

2010s

In autumn 2010, A&P closed 25 stores, including some Pathmark stores.

In August 2011, a Super Fresh store opened in the Northern Liberties section of Philadelphia in place of a planned Pathmark, reflecting the parent company's diminished faith in the Pathmark banner.

A&P's bankruptcy filings

On December 12, 2010, A&P filed for Chapter 11 bankruptcy protection, citing assets of $2.5 billion and debts totaling $3.2 billion. The company emerged from bankruptcy protection on March 13, 2012, making its six supermarket divisions, including Pathmark, private.

On July 26, 2013, the Wall Street Journal reported that A&P is seeking to sell the company after emerging from bankruptcy in 2012.

On July 19, 2015, A&P filed for Chapter 11 protection for the second time in less than five years. By November 25, 2015 all Pathmark stores were either closed or sold to other chains such as Acme Markets, Stop & Shop, Key Food, ShopRite, and other competitors. The 156-year history of A&P also disappeared.

Relaunch 
On February 10, 2016 Retailer-owned cooperative Allegiance Retail Services LLC purchased the Pathmark name and all intellectual property associated with the brand, including the Pathmark logo, trademarks and the pathmark.com domain name. The purchase price was not disclosed. 

On April 19, 2019, Allegiance opened a fully renovated supermarket under the Pathmark brand, in a former Key Food supermarket which had been a Pathmark prior to 2015, located at 1525 Albany Avenue in Brooklyn, NY. Allegiance has hopes to expand Pathmark if the location in Brooklyn does well

Slogans
 
Shop Pathmark, the store for value (1968-1978)
All Signs Point to Pathmark for One Stop Shopping (1978-1981)
You've got Pathmark. Who could ask for anything more? (1978-1981)
We're Pathmark, We're All-Ways There! (1981-1982)
Savings all over means savings over all (1982-1984)
You're the one who's number one (1984–1988)
Pathmark, More Value For Your Dollar (1988-1990)
Count on Pathmark For Savings That Count (1991-1992)
Count on Pathmark For Savings That (Really) Count (1991-1994)
Pathmark, Your Place to Really Save (1993-1994)
Shop Smart, Pathmark Smart (1994-1997)
Pathmark, The way it should be! (1997-2000)
Pathmark, Take a Fresh Look (2000–2002)
Get a Little More at Pathmark (2002–2004)
Pathmark, It's about time (2004–late 2006)
Go Fresh. Go Local. (2006–2008)
Fresh For Less (2008)
Count On Pathmark When It Counts (2008–2009)
Pathmark! Save all over the place! (2009 – April 2010)
Where the only prices are low prices. (April 2010 – January 2011)
 Your Store For Value! (January 2011 – March 2011)
Great Food. Great Value. (March 2011 – November 2015)
We priced it right (April 2019 - Present)
Pathmark makes life easier. (January 2019 – Present)

References

The Great Atlantic & Pacific Tea Company
Economy of the Northeastern United States
Companies formerly listed on the Nasdaq
American companies established in 1968
Retail companies established in 1968
Companies based in Bergen County, New Jersey
Supermarkets of the United States
1968 establishments in New Jersey
Woodbridge Township, New Jersey
Defunct supermarkets of the United States
Retail companies disestablished in 2015
American companies established in 2019
Retail companies established in 2019
Companies that filed for Chapter 11 bankruptcy in 2010
Companies that filed for Chapter 11 bankruptcy in 2015
2015 disestablishments in New Jersey
2007 mergers and acquisitions
Re-established companies